Sergey Bondarenko (born 19 May 1994) is a Belarusian professional footballer who plays for Kaisar.

References

External links 
 
 

1994 births
Living people
People from Smarhon’
Sportspeople from Grodno Region
Belarusian footballers
Association football midfielders
Belarusian expatriate footballers
Expatriate footballers in Kazakhstan
FC Dinamo Minsk players
FC Smorgon players
FC Bereza-2010 players
FC Lokomotiv Gomel players
FC Kaisar players